Konon Trofimovich Molody (17 January 1922 – 9 September 1970) was a Soviet intelligence officer, known in the West as Gordon Arnold Lonsdale. Posing as a Canadian businessman during the Cold War he was a non-official (illegal) KGB intelligence agent and the mastermind of the Portland Spy Ring, which operated in Britain from the late 1950s until 1961.

Gordon Lonsdale identity
A person by the name of Gordon Arnold Lonsdale was born on 27 August 1924 in Cobalt, Ontario, Canada. His father Emmanuel Jack Lonsdale was a miner. His mother Olga Elina Bousa had emigrated from Finland. The Lonsdales separated in 1931. A year later, Olga took her 8-year-old son with her back to her native Finland. He is believed to have died c. 1943 and the Soviets obtained his papers for use by their agents. The actual Gordon Lonsdale was recorded as having been circumcised; the impostor was not.

Molody's early life
Konon Molody was born in Moscow in 1922, the son of a scientist and his wife. His father died when he was a child. According to Konon's son, Trofim Molody, who wrote a book about his father, Soviet intelligence already had their eyes on the young boy. In 1934 the NKVD chief Genrikh Yagoda helped Konon's mother get a foreign passport for him to leave for the US to study in California and live there with his aunt, dance teacher Tatiana Piankova. Between 1936 and 1938 he was enrolled at the A to Z junior high school in Berkeley; According to his official SVR biography, he left the USSR in 1932.

Molody returned to the Soviet Union in 1938, having learned English and gained familiarity with American culture. In October 1940, he became a Red Army conscript, serving as a reconnaissance and military intelligence officer during World War II. Demobilised after the end of the war, from 1946 Molody enrolled as a war veteran into the Trade Law Department of the prestigious Institute of Foreign Trade, where he mastered the Chinese language.

Spying career
In 1951 Molody was recruited by the MGB First Chief Directorate (Political intelligence wing) and trained as a MGB "illegal agent" (NOC) on foreign soil. During his intelligence training he married and had two children. In 1953, Molody travelled to Canada on a Soviet merchant ship, posing as a Canadian national named "Gordon Lonsdale" (the true Lonsdale having died in Finland in the early 1940s). The MGB foreign branch had taken possession of Finnish public records after the war and had frequently used them to establish new spy identities. From Canada, "Gordon Lonsdale" illegally travelled without a visa to the US, where he started his operations as an aid to atomic spy Rudolph Abel. He also first met the American communist couple Morris and Lona Cohen (UK cover names Peter and Helen Kroger).

In 1954, Konon Molody moved to London, where as a Canadian citizen he enrolled at the London University School of Oriental and African Studies and again studied Chinese. He had numerous female friends in London and Europe. Using business as a cover, Molody headed a London KGB front company manufacturing and trading in jukeboxes, bubble-gum and gambling machines. He may have recruited other agents and set up dead letter boxes while on his business trips to West Europe. Once a year he would spend time in Prague or Warsaw with his Russian wife Galina. She was led by the KGB to believe Konon was posted in Beijing as a member of the Soviet trade mission.

In 1959, Molody began receiving British military secrets from Admiralty Underwater Weapons Establishment clerk Harry Houghton. Lonsdale clandestinely liaised with the Krogers in London as well during his European trips and ran other spies, including Melita Norwood. The Krogers acted as his technical support; he communicated with Moscow via their hidden radio transmitter.

UK conviction for espionage

Lonsdale came under suspicion from MI5 in 1959 after a meeting with Houghton. At the request of MI5, the Treasury gave permission to search a private safe box at the Midland Bank on Great Portland Street. Concealed within a lighter was a London map for places to conceal or collect information.

On 7 January 1961, Metropolitan Police Special Branch team of Detective Superintendent George Gordon Smith arrested five people, all members of the Portland Spy Ring. Gordon Lonsdale was arrested on the Waterloo Bridge the same moment he had received classified material from Harry Houghton. At Scotland Yard, he told Smith he would not disclose his real name or address or any other information. MI5, the Central Intelligence Agency (CIA), and the Royal Canadian Mounted Police (RCMP) investigators' team had to resort to extensive enquiries. They were able to pinpoint his Russian origin, naval background, and use of false Canadian papers. 

On 13 March 1961 at the Old Bailey, Lonsdale was charged with spying, along with associates Harry Houghton, Ethel Gee and Morris and Lona Cohen (Peter and Helen Kroger). At the time of the trial, British authorities were still unsure of his true identity. In March 1961, the defendants were found guilty, and Lonsdale received a 25-year sentence. He was to start his sentence at Winson Green Prison, Birmingham. From his single cell, he fraternised with some of the Great Train Robbers. In due course, the British and American security services managed to establish his true identity as Russian citizen Konon Molody.

On 22 April 1964, he was exchanged in a spy-swap for Greville Wynne, a British businessman apprehended and convicted in Moscow for his contacts with Oleg Penkovsky. The prisoners were swapped at the Heerstraße Checkpoint in Berlin.

Later life in Russia
A year after his return to the Soviet Union he published a book Spy: Memoirs of Gordon Lonsdale with the author still maintaining he was born in Canada. Issued with the approval of the Soviet authorities, he also claimed Peter and Helen Kroger, convicted as members of the Portland Ring, were innocent.

Molody died from a stroke on a mushroom picking expedition in a suburban forest in October 1970; at the age of 48. Konon's youth friend and retired KGB intelligence agent Leonid Kolosov co-wrote The Dead Season: End of the Legend. He maintained that Konon was healthy upon his return from the UK but began complaining about KGB doctors giving him injections against high blood pressure. Konon had headaches he never had before but the doctors said he should expect to "feel worse before he felt better".

He is buried at the Donskoy Cemetery in Moscow next to Vilyam Genrikovich Fisher (aka Colonel Rudolf Abel). A 1968 film Dead Season was based on Molody's mission in the UK. where he personally advised  Donatas Banionis who played him, and believed that resemblance between him and the actor was significant.

References

Further reading
SPY: twenty years of secret service: memoirs of Gordon Lonsdale, Hawthorn Books NY, N. Spearman, London, (1965).
Spy Book: The Encyclopedia of Espionage, by Norman Polmar and Thomas B. Allen, published by Greenhill Books,  (1997)
The Mitrokhin Archive: The KGB in Europe and the West, by Christopher Andrew and Vasili Mitrokhin, published by Penguin Press History,  (1999)
 "The Portland Spy Case" by Ludovic Kennedy, in Great Cases of Scotland Yard by Reader's Digest, pages 306–414.
 Dead Doubles by Trevor Barnes, published by Weidenfeld and Nicolson,  (2020)

External links

  Biography at the website of Russian Foreign Intelligence Service
Grave

1922 births
1970 deaths
Soviet spies
People convicted of spying for the Soviet Union
Cold War spies
KGB officers
Soviet people imprisoned abroad
Portland Spy Ring
Soviet Cold War spymasters
1961 in military history
1961 in politics
Recipients of British royal pardons
Burials at Donskoye Cemetery
Alumni of SOAS University of London